is a Japanese castle located in Tateyama, southern Chiba Prefecture, Japan. At the end of the Edo period, Tateyama Castle was home to the Inaba clan, daimyō of Tateyama Domain, but the castle is better known for its association with the former rulers of Awa Province, the Satomi clan.

History 
Satomi Yoshiyori, virtually independent lord of all of the Bōsō Peninsula during the Sengoku Period, erected Tateyama Castle in 1580 to guard the entry to Edo Bay and the southern portions of his domains. After the Satomi clan was destroyed by the Tokugawa shogunate in 1614 and Tateyama Domain suppressed, the castle was allowed to fall into ruin.

In 1781, the domain was reinstated, with Inaba Masaaki as the first daimyō of Tateyama Domain under the Inaba clan. He rebuilt the fortifications of the old castle, but apparently did not erect a donjon, as his successor, Inaba Masatake was only allowed to build a jinya fortified residence. The Inaba clan remained in residence at Tateyama until the Meiji Restoration.

The current donjon was reconstructed in 1982 to boost local tourism and to function as an annex to the local Tateyama City Museum. As there are no surviving records indicating the appearance of the original donjon, the current structure was modeled after Inuyama Castle. The interior is devoted primarily to exhibits pertaining to the epic novel Nanso Satomi Hakkenden, by Edo period author Takizawa Bakin.

The surrounding  is a popular local spot for bird-watching, and for sakura blossoms in spring.

Literature

References

External links

  Tateyama Castle Jcastle Profile

Castles in Chiba Prefecture
Museums in Chiba Prefecture
History museums in Japan
Historic Sites of Japan
Former castles in Japan
Ruined castles in Japan
Satomi clan